Bayar Yesui (born 21 July 2000) is a Mongolian swimmer. She competed in the women's 50 metre freestyle at the 2016 Summer Olympics and finished 60th with a time of 28.40 seconds out of 91 contestants. She did not advance to the semifinals, which required a top 16 finish in the heats. Bayar Yesui is the youngest Olympian from Mongolia.

References

External links
 

2000 births
Living people
Mongolian female swimmers
Olympic swimmers of Mongolia
Swimmers at the 2016 Summer Olympics
Place of birth missing (living people)
Swimmers at the 2014 Asian Games
Swimmers at the 2018 Asian Games
Asian Games competitors for Mongolia
Mongolian female freestyle swimmers
21st-century Mongolian women